Senator Barber may refer to:

F. Elliott Barber Jr. (1912–1992), Vermont State Senate
Herbert G. Barber (1870–1947), Vermont State Senate
Homer G. Barber (1830–1909), Michigan State Senate
J. Allen Barber (1809–1881), Wisconsin State Senate
Joseph L. Barber (1864–1940), Wisconsin State Senate
Merrill P. Barber (1910–1985), Florida State Senate
Orion M. Barber (1857–1930), Vermont State Senate